Sankt Martin an der Raab is a town in the district of Jennersdorf in the Austrian state of Burgenland.

Geography
Cadastral communities are Doiber, Gritsch, Neumarkt an der Raab, Oberdrosen, Sankt Martin an der Raab and Welten.

Population

References

Cities and towns in Jennersdorf District
Slovenian communities in Burgenland